George Prince Karki (born 26 October 1993) is a Nepalese international footballer and a captain in the Nepali Army who plays as a forward for Nepal Army Club and the Nepal national football team. In September 2017, he was called up to the national team for the first time, replacing Anil Gurung.

References

1995 births
Living people
Nepalese footballers
Nepal international footballers
People from Kavrepalanchok District
Association football forwards
Nepalese military personnel